Popstars Remixed is a remixed album by Italian girl group Lollipop, released on March 8, 2002 via WEA Records / Warner Music Italy. It didn't reach even #75 on the Italian album chart but spawned the hit single Batte Forte (#9) which proved to be popular in radios and became also a success in Italian gay discos where it is still played regularly. The rest of the track list featured remixed tracks taken from the first group's album Popstars and the remixed version of the new single "Batte forte".

Track listing

CD one

CD two

Charts
Album 

The album sold nearly 20.000 copies

Singles

Lollipop (Italian band) albums
2002 remix albums
Warner Music Group remix albums